Diarmuid O'Keeffe (born 2 January 1992) is an Irish hurler who plays for Wexford Senior Championship club St Anne's Rathangan and at inter-county level with the Wexford senior hurling team. He usually lines out as a midfielder.

Playing career

St. Anne's Rathangan

O'Keeffe joined the St Anne's Rathangan club at a young age and played in all grades at juvenile and underage levels as a dual player. He experienced championship success in the under-21 grade as a Gaelic footballer before joining the club's top adult teams in both codes.

On 8 October 2012, O'Keeffe lined out at left wing-forward when St Anne's Rathangan faced Castletown in the final of the Wexford Football Championship. He was held scoreless throughout the game but ended with a winners' medal following the 2-14 to 0-08 victory.

O'Keeffe was selected at full-forward when he lined out in a second Wexford Football Championship final on 16 November 2014. He was once again held scoreless in a final but collected a second winners' medal after a 1-06 to 0-08 defeat of Gusserane.

Wexford

Minor and under-21

O'Keeffe first played for Wexford as a member of the minor team as a 16-year-old during the 2008 Leinster Championship. On 6 July 2008, he was introduced as a substitute at left corner-forward when Wexford suffered a 1-19 to 0-12 defeat by Kilkenny in the Leinster final.

O'Keeffe was once again eligible for the minor grade in 2009. He lined out at right wing-forward in a second successive Leinster final on 5 July 2009, however, Wexford suffered a 1-19 to 0-11 defeat by Kilkenny.

For the third year in succession, O'Keeffe was included on the Wexford minor team for the 2010 Leinster Championship. He played his last game in the grade on 26 June 2010 when he scored two points from right wing-forward in a 1-16 to 1-15 defeat by Dublin.

On 22 June 2011, O'Keeffe made his first appearance for the Wexford under-21 team. After starting the game on the bench he was introduced as a 44th-minute substitute for Emmet Kent at midfield in a 7-18 to 2-10 defeat of Laois. On 13 July 2011, O'Keeffe came on as a substitute when Wexford suffered a 1-18 to 0-11 defeat by Dublin in the Leinster final.

O'Keeffe was appointed captain of the Wexford under-21 football team in 2013, while he was also a member of the extended panel of the under-21 hurling team. On 11 July 2013, he was a member of the extended panel when the Wexford under-21 hurlers defeated Kilkenny by 1-21 to 0-21 to win the Leinster Championship.

Senior

O'Keeffe was added to the Wexford senior team in advance of the 2012 National League. He made his first appearance for the team on 26 February 2012 when he lined out at centre-forward when Wexford suffered a 3-18 to 2-15 defeat by Antrim. 

On 2 July 2017, O'Keeffe was selected at left wing-back when Wexford qualified for their first Leinster final in nine years. He scored 1-01 from play in the 0-29 to 1-17 defeat by Galway at Croke Park.

On 20 January 2018, O'Keeffe was named amongst the substitutes when Wexford faced Kilkenny in the Walsh Cup final. He was introduced as a substitute for Aaron Maddock in the 1-24 apiece draw. Wexford won the subsequent free-taking shoot-out, with O'Keeffe claiming his first silverware at senior level with Wexford.

Wexford reached a second Leinster final in three years on 30 June 2019 with O'Keeffe being selected at midfield. He scored two points from play and collected a winners' medal following the 1-23 to 0-23 defeat of Kilkenny.

Honours

St Anne's Rathangan
Wexford Senior Football Championship (2): 2012, 2014
Wexford Under-21 Hurling Championship (1): 2011

Wexford
Leinster Senior Hurling Championship (1): 2019
Leinster Under-21 Hurling Championship (1): 2013

Awards
GAA/GPA Player of the Month (1): June 2019

References

1992 births
Living people
Irish schoolteachers
St Anne's (Wexford) hurlers
Wexford inter-county hurlers